Inner Crail To Outer Space is the third studio album by King Creosote, released in 1998.

Track listing
For The Last Time - Hello       
Dressing Up As Girls       
Camels Swapped For Wives       
Visiting Hours       
Promises       
Your Happy Day       
I.O.W.A.       
Eight And The Same       
A Friday Night In New York       
Let It Come       
A Breeze       
Hymn       
Over  
Or Is It?

1998 albums
King Creosote albums